The Scarlet Dove is a 1928 American silent drama film directed by Arthur Gregor and starring Lowell Sherman, Robert Frazer and Josephine Borio.

Cast
 Lowell Sherman as Ivan Orloff  
 Robert Frazer as Alexis Petroff 
 Josephine Borio as Mara  
 Margaret Livingston as Olga  
 Shirley Palmer as Eve  
 Carlos Durand as Gregory  
 Julia Swayne Gordon as The Aunt

Preservation status
The film is preserved by the BFI National Film and Television Archive, London.

References

Bibliography
 Weaver, John T. Twenty Years of Silents, 1908-1928. Scarecrow Press, 1971.

External links

1928 films
1928 drama films
Silent American drama films
Films directed by Arthur Gregor
American silent feature films
1920s English-language films
Tiffany Pictures films
Films set in Russia
American black-and-white films
1920s American films